Andreas Smits (14 June 1870 – 13 November 1948) was Dutch chemist who specialized in physical and inorganic chemistry and examined aspects of phase change and conversions between allotropic forms. He was a professor at the Delft University of Technology.

Smits was born in Woerden and received a degree from the University of Utrecht, and a doctorate from the University of Giessen (1896) with a dissertation on "Untersuchungen mit dem Mikromanometer." He then worked as a chemist in the Amsterdam Municipal Gasworks before joining the University of Amsterdam in 1901. He became a professor at the Delft University of Technology in 1906 and worked there until his retirement in 1940. He published Die Theorie der Allotropie (1921) and Die Theorie der Komplexität und der Allotropie (1938).

Papers by Smits include:

References

External links 
 Biography (in Dutch)

1870 births
1948 deaths
Dutch chemists
University of Giessen alumni
Academic staff of the Delft University of Technology
Utrecht University alumni
Academic staff of the University of Amsterdam